The International S series is a range of trucks that was manufactured by International Harvester (later Navistar International) from 1977 to 2001.  Introduced to consolidate the medium-duty IHC Loadstar and heavy-duty IHC Fleetstar into a single product range, the S series was slotted below the Transtar and Paystar Class 8 conventionals. 

The IHC S series was produced in a number of variants for a wide variety of applications, including straight trucks, semitractors, vocational trucks, and severe-service trucks.  Additionally, the S series was produced in other body configurations, including a four-door crew cab, cutaway cab, cowled chassis, and a stripped chassis (primarily for school buses).  The chassis was produced with both gasoline and diesel powertrains (the latter exclusively after 1986), single or tandem rear axles, and two, four, or, six-wheel drive layouts. 

The last complete product line designed within the existence of International Harvester, the S series was produced in its original form through 1989.  During 1989, the S-Series underwent a major revision and was split into multiple model lines.  After 2001, International phased in product lines based upon the "NGV" architecture; severe-service and bus chassis variants produced through 2003 and 2004, respectively.

Previous use of name 

The S-series model designation was first used by International Harvester during the 1950s.  During 1955 production, the R series model family underwent an update, with International renaming its light-duty and medium-duty trucks the S-series.                    

The model designation was used through 1957, when International introduced the A-series model family as an all-new design.

First generation (S series; 1978–1989) 

In April 1977, International Harvester unveiled the medium-duty S series at an event at the New Orleans Superdome. The initial lineup consisted of heavier-duty 2200, 2500, and 2600 models (28,000-45,000 lb gross vehicle weight  rating - GVWR), replacing the Fleetstar. In the summer of 1978, lighter-GVWR models (replacing the Loadstar) were released for sale. The 21 models of the full lineup had a high degree of parts interghangability; this standardization helped lower the number of parts used by 30%.

Following the discontinuation of the IHC pickup-truck line in 1975, the S series was designed with a model-specific cab, replacing the pickup-truck cab used for the Loadstar (designed for the 1957 A series). More vertically oriented than its predecessor, the design was much wider, as well. To lower maintenance costs, all windows in the cab were designed with flat glass, including the windshield. Similar in style to the tilting hood introduced for the Loadstar in 1972, all S-series trucks were given a tilting fiberglass hood.

The S series was produced throughout the 1980s, largely unmodified, and 1987 marked several changes to the S-series trucks. To reflect the corporate transition of the company from International Harvester to Navistar International, S-series trucks received changes in their badging (alongside all International vehicles). On the grille, the word "International" across the top of the grille was replaced by a red Navistar "diamond" logo alongside "International" in red at the bottom left of the grille. Inside, the IHC "tractor" logo on the steering wheel was replaced by a Navistar diamond logo. In a major shift, for 1987, International became the first truck manufacturer to produce a medium-duty product line powered exclusively by diesel engines.

Models 
Originally intended to use the International Tristar nameplate, the S series consolidated the aging Loadstar and Fleetstar trucks under a single product line. Tandem-axle (6x4) versions of the S series were named F-series trucks.

Class 6 trucks 
The S1600, S1700, S1800, and S1900 were introduced in 1979. Replacing the International Harvester Loadstar model line, the model was produced in a number of configurations, with single and tandem rear axles, 4x4/6x6 drive options, and gasoline and diesel engines. The S-1800 and S-1900-were produced as both truck tractors (for semitrailers) and straight trucks, while the S-1700 and S-1800 were used in the production of International Harvester bus chassis (primarily for school-bus use).

Class 7-8 trucks 
Introduced in 1978 as the replacement for the Fleetstar, the S2100 and S2200 were joined by the severe-service S2500 and S2600, slotted below the International Paystar 5000.  Configured primarily as tractors, the S2100s were fitted with a sloped hood.  To accommodate larger-bore diesel engines under a standard-length hood, the S2200 was fitted with a widened cab (distinguished by a two-piece windshield).  

In 1982, the S2300 was introduced; the model line was essentially an S2100 with International diesel engines replaced with Cummins-sourced powertrains.     

1978–1983 models

Second generation (1989–2002) 
As a running change during 1989 production, the S-series model line underwent an extensive revision.  While the cab structure was retained, the interior and exterior underwent a complete redesign.  To optimize aerodynamics, the model line was given a lower hoodline and closer-fitting fenders (with halogen headlamps and wraparound turn signals).  An all-new dashboard received a redesigned instrument panel along with a two-spoke steering wheel.  

During its production life, the second-generation vehicles had few major changes.  From 1989 to its 2001 discontinuation, the exterior remained nearly unchanged; in 1992, Navistar changed the design of the instrument panel, updating the entire interior in 1995.

Models 

For 1989, Navistar split the S-series model line into three distinct model families, all sharing the same cab structure.  The 4000 series was the medium-duty truck range (the 3000 series bus chassis replaced the "Schoolmaster"), with the 7100/8100 serving as the Class 7/8 tractor series.  The 2500/2600 severe-service truck were carried over, dropping their S-series badging prefix.

Class 5-7 trucks 
Replacing the S1600 through S1900, the 4000 series was again produced in a number of configurations, with single and tandem rear axles, 4x4/6x6 drive options. Produced exclusively with diesel engines, the 4000 series was produced with the IDI V8 and DT360/DT466 engines.

The 4000 series was produced through 2001, when it was replaced by an all-new 4000 series (now the International DuraStar).

Class 7-8 trucks 
Replacing the S2100 and S2300, the 7100 and 8100 were introduced in 1989; the wide-body S2200 was not replaced. Configured nearly exclusively as tractors, the 8000 series was powered by the Cummins L10 diesel; the 7100 was a variant powered by the DT466.

The 8000 series was produced through 2001, when it was replaced by an all-new 8000 series (now the International Transtar).

Severe-service trucks 
Again slotted below the Paystar, the 2500 and 2600 severe-service trucks dropped their S-series prefix. During the 1990s, the set-back axle 2674 was restyled with the aerodynamic hood of the 8300. The 2500/2600 remained in production through 2003, outlasted only by the 3800 school-bus chassis.

Bus use 

Throughout its production, the S series was used as a cowled chassis for bus manufacturers.  Used primarily for yellow school buses in the United States and Canada, the S series also was used outside of North America as a basis to produce other types of bus bodies. Introduced in 1979, the bus variant of the S series was one of the final models designed by International Harvester before its transition to Navistar.  In 1989, the S-series bus chassis was rechristened the 3000 series with the fitment of the new-generation Navistar cowl.

Produced until 2004, the bus chassis outlived its truck counterpart by three years; its 25-year production run is the longest of any North American product ever sold by International Harvester or Navistar. The unrelated Australian ACCO cabover truck built under various guises by IH and IVECO was produced with the same cab architecture for 47 years.

Models

Powertrain

See also

List of International Harvester vehicles

Notes

References 

American Truck & Bus Spotter's Guide: 1920-1985, by Tad Burness.
International Trucks, by Frederick W. Crismon

External links
International S (Internet Movie Cars Database)
Russell MacNeil photo, July 6, 2005 (Hank's Truck Pictures)

S series
Navistar International trucks
Vehicles introduced in 1978
Commercial vehicles